YTV is a Canadian English language discretionary specialty channel owned by YTV Canada, Inc., a subsidiary of Corus Entertainment. The channel and its programming is targeted at children and young teenagers; its name was originally thought to be an abbreviation for "Youth Television", though the channel's website has denied this.

The channel was launched on September 1, 1988 by owners Rogers Media and CUC Broadcasting upon launch. In 1995, Shaw Communications acquired CUC's 34% stake and in 1998, it acquired Rogers' remaining interest of the channel, before Shaw's media division was spun off to form Corus Entertainment in 1999. Under Corus ownership, YTV sources most of its programming from U.S.-based Nickelodeon and launched its own dedicated TV channel 21 years later.

YTV operates two time shifted feeds, running on both Eastern and Pacific Time Zone schedules, and is available in over 11.0 million households in Canada as of 2013.

History
The channel was licensed by the Canadian Radio-television and Telecommunications Commission (CRTC) in 1987 by Rogers Cable and CUC Broadcasting.

The channel launched on September 1, 1988, at 7:00 p.m., with the first program being a special party celebrating the launch of YTV, hosted by John Candy. At launch, Rogers held 75% of the channel while CUC owned 25%.

In 1995, Calgary-based Shaw Communications acquired CUC's stake of 34% ownership of YTV. Shaw acquired Rogers' remaining share in 1998 to take full control of it. In 1999, the media assets of Shaw were spun off to form Corus Entertainment.

Two Corus specialty channel applications for YTV extensions, YTV POW!, an internationally sourced kids' action, adventure and superhero genre, and YTV OneWorld, targeting children from age 9 to 17 with travel, humour, games, and STEM were approved on September 18, 2008. The YTV Oneworld license was used to launch Nickelodeon Canada.

On January 11, 2011, a high-definition feed was launched.

Programming

Current YTV original programming include hosted programming blocks, such as The Zone. In addition to original programming, YTV has historically acquired and co-produced programming with the U.S cable network Nickelodeon.

Programming blocks

Current
 Fam Fun (2021–present)
 The Zone (September 2, 1991–present)
 The Zone Weekend is co-hosted by Spencer Litzinger and Alex Wierzbicki.
 Big Fun Movies (January 2, 2011–present)

Former
 
 The Treehouse (1994–98)
 YTV Jr. (September 7, 1998 – 2002)
 YTV PlayTime (2010–12)
 Bionix (September 10, 2004 – February 7, 2010)
 CRUNCH (September 9, 2006 – September 28, 2013)
 Big Fun Weeknights
 Big Fun Fridays
 3 Hairy Thumbs Up (October 19, 2002 to August 31, 2008)
 Moovibot (September 5, 2008 – September 6, 2009)
 ZAPX Movies (September 11, 2005 – November 7, 2010)
 Vortex (YTV) (September 15, 2001 – June 24, 2006)
 Brainwash
 Snit Station
 Limbo (2000-2001)
 Toon Town Alley
 The Alley
 The Breakfast Zone (1995–1996)
 The B-Zone
 The Vault (1997)
 YTV Shift
 Spine Chilling Saturday Nights (1998)
 The Dark Corner
 Whiplash Wednesdays
 Nickelodeon Sundays
 Famalama DingDong

Program jockeys

Starting in September 1990, YTV called their program jockeys "PJs" in the same vein as disc jockey (DJ) or video jockey (VJ). Current hosts of these segments have since dropped the moniker as of the mid-1990s.

Current program jockeys
 The Zone is co-hosted by Spencer Litzinger, Melony Manikavasagar and Kelsey Liem.

 Big Fun Movies is hosted by Kelsey Liem.

Past program jockeys/hosts

 Meisha Watson 
 Carlos Bustamante
 Lisa Gilroy
 Victor Verbitsky
 Stephanie "Sugar" Beard
 Elizabeth Becker
 Jenn Beech, also known as "PJ Jenn"
 Stéphanie Broschart 
 Andrew Chapman
 Rachael Crawford
 Laura DaSilva 
 Emily Agard
 Ali J. Eisner, also known as "Carrie Funkwash"
 Janis Mackey Frayer, also known as "PJ Jazzy Jan"
 The Grogs, puppeteers Jamie Shannon and Jason Hopley
 Phil Guerrero, also known as "PJ Fresh Phil"
 Laurie Gelman (née Hibberd)
 Daryn Jones
 Pat Kelly, also known as "Random Pat"
 Krista Jackson, also known as "PJ Krista"
 "PJ Simon"
 Paul McGuire
 Simon Mohos
 Ajay Fry
 Paula Lemyre
 Shaun Majumder, also known as "Ed Brainbin"
 Aashna Patel, also known as "PJ Aashna"
 Joyce Quansah 
 Jennifer Katie Racicot, also known as "PJ Katie"
 Michael Quast, also known as "Michael Q"
 Anand Rajaram, the voice of Snit on Snit Station
 Atul N. Rao, Snit's voice & puppeteer on The Zone
 Rob Stefaniuk, also known as "PJ Rob"
 Chandra Galasso, also known as "PJ Rockin Chan"
 Marty Stelnick, puppeteer 
 Phil McCordic, also known as "PJ Taylor"
 Gordon Michael Woolvett, also known as "Gord the PJ Man"
 Russell Zeid
 Honey Khan
 Cory Atkins
 Exan AuYoung
 Mark McAllister
 Wilf Dinnick
 "Tarzan" Dan Freeman
 Shauna MacDonald
 Adrian Pryce

Related services

Treehouse 

Treehouse is a Category A cable and satellite specialty channel which airs programming targeted to preschoolers, from 2 to 5. It launched on November 1, 1997. The channel's name is taken from YTV's now-defunct children's programming block, The Treehouse. Treehouse is carried nationwide throughout Canada and it broadcasts its programming without commercial interruption.

Nickelodeon 

Nickelodeon is a Category B cable and satellite specialty channel that was launched on November 2, 2009, and is based on the U.S. cable channel Nickelodeon. Like its counterparts in the U.S. and elsewhere, Nickelodeon airs programs aimed at children to younger teenagers, targeted at 7—11. including both live action series and animation.

Former

Vortex on Demand
In July 2005, Corus Entertainment partnered up with Comcast Corporation to launch a cable video-on-demand service called "Vortex on Demand" in the United States. The deal consisted of 393 30 minute animation TV series from the Nelvana library; it aired programs such as Cadillacs & Dinosaurs and Medabots. The service was discontinued in mid-2007.

Bionix On Demand
In 2008, Corus Entertainment began offering a video-on-demand service called "Bionix On Demand" to Canadian cable providers. Rogers Cable and Shaw Cable were the only providers to offer the service. The service offered older and newer anime programs that did not air on YTV itself. The video-on-demand service was previously titled "YTV Anime On Demand". Bionix On Demand was discontinued on December 17, 2009, and was replaced by YTV On Demand.

YTV GO
YTV GO was a TV Everywhere mobile app available on the App Store and Google Play Store. It was available at no extra charge to all subscribed customers of Access Communications, Bell Satellite TV, Cogeco, Shaw Cable, Shaw Direct, Telus, and VMedia. It offered episodes of various programming from YTV. The app operated between September 2015 and May 1, 2019.

Related businesses
 Whoa! magazine, YTV's official magazine, began publication in 1999 by Creative House, a joint venture between the channel, Today's Parent Group and Paton Publishing. It was distributed through Pizza Hut, YTV events, Chapters and Indigo bookstores, Canadian newsstands, and subscriptions. Three issues were released in its first year, followed by four in 2000 before the magazine officially became a quarterly (spring, summer, fall, and winter) in 2001. The magazine celebrated its fifth anniversary with a spring collector's issue in 2004. In 2007, the magazine became available as an e-zine on YTV.com. Building on that, in 2008 two additional issues (six for the year) were published as online exclusives. In 2009, YTV ended its association with the magazine. Patton relaunched Whoa! as a magazine/blogging platform without the YTV branding that same year, before ceasing publication in 2011 and shutting the site down in 2012.
 Big Fun Party Mix was a series of compilation cassettes/CDs containing songs from various tween approved artists, as well as tracks featured in YTV's Hit List and The Next Star, plus performances by the stations band "Nuclear Donkey". Universal Music Canada published 11 entries from 2000 to 2009.
 Yabber.net was a moderated online chat room operated from 2001 to 2004. The site hosted live chats between viewers and celebrities, voice actors, YTV hosts, and staff. Upon its closure, YTV.com absorbed some of its functionality.
 The Big Rip was an online portal for browser-based massively multiplayer online games for preteens. Developed by Corus Entertainment and Frima Studio, it launched February 15, 2007. Frima later assumed complete control of the portal before ceasing updates in 2010 and later shutting down the site.
 YTV Spills was a follow-up quarterly magazine to Whoa! produced in association with The Magazine between 2010 and 2012.
 Keep It Weird is a YouTube channel featuring various productions by Nelvana, another division of Corus Entertainment, along with past Nickelodeon series, channel promos, and YTV originals. It launched in 2015 under the name Nelvana Retro and was later rebranded to YTV Direct in 2016 before assuming its current name in 2018.

International distribution
 Jamaica - distributed on Flow Cable systems.
 Bahamas - formerly distributed on Cable Bahamas systems channel 307. Removed from the channel line up as of September 2020 due to the programming lineup changes.

References

External links
 
 
 

 
1988 establishments in Canada
Television channels and stations established in 1988
Children's television networks in Canada
English-language television stations in Canada
Corus Entertainment networks
Analog cable television networks in Canada